Mali-United States relations, while historically friendly, were radically altered by the March 2012 military coup in Mali that ousted the previous democratic government.  The Mali government was a strong partner with the U.S. in its efforts to combat violent extremists, but the United States officially suspended military relations with Mali following the military coup.

According to a 2007 global opinion poll, 79% of Malians view the United States favorably. According to the 2012 U.S. Global Leadership Report, 87% of Malians approve of U.S. leadership, with 10% disapproving and 4% uncertain, the second-highest rating of the U.S. for any surveyed country in Africa.

History
The United States and Mali established diplomatic relations on September 24, 1960.

Mali was a regional partner in the Global War on Terrorism. Mali also serves as an important laboratory for testing new anti-malaria medicines for use by American citizen travelers and for research that will have an Africa-wide impact. USAID, Peace Corps, and other U.S. Government programs play a significant role in fostering sustainable economic and social development. Prior to the March 2012 military coup, USAID programs also served to strengthen efforts to consolidate the peace process in northern Mali and the region's socioeconomic and political integration.  In response to the coup, all aid from the United States was cut off.

Principal U.S. Officials include:
 Ambassador Gillian Milovanovic
 Deputy Chief of Mission--Peter Barlerin
 Director, USAID Mission--Rebecca Black
 Director, Peace Corps--Michael Simsik
 Public Affairs Officer—Kate Kaetzer-Hodson
 Management Officer—Matthew Cook
 Political/Economic Officer—Peter Newman
 Consular Officer—Rebecca Drame
 Defense Attaché—LTC Eric Dalton

Former ambassadors

Among the previous eighteen U.S. Ambassadors to Mali are included:
 Robert O. Blake
 Patricia M. Byrne
 Anne Forrester
 Parker W. Borg
 Vicki Huddleston

Diplomatic missions 

The Embassy of Mali in Washington, D.C. is the diplomatic mission of the Republic of Mali to the United States. The embassy is located at 2130 R Street Northwest in the Kalorama neighborhood of Washington, D.C.

There is a U.S. Embassy in Bamako, Mali.

See also
Malian Americans
Foreign relations of Mali

References

External links
History of Mali - U.S. relations

 
Bilateral relations of the United States
United States